The 1920–21 season was the 48th season of competitive football in Scotland and the 31st season of the Scottish Football League.

Scottish Football League

Champions: Rangers

Scottish Cup

Partick Thistle were winners of the Scottish Cup after a 1–0 final win over Rangers.

Other honours

National

County

. *replay

Highland League

Junior Cup

Kirkintilloch Rob Roy were winners of the Junior Cup after a 1–0 win over Ashfield in the final.

Scotland national team

Scotland were winners of the 1921 British Home Championship.

Key:
 (H) = Home match
 (A) = Away match
 BHC = British Home Championship

See also
1920–21 Aberdeen F.C. season

Notes and references

External links
Scottish Football Historical Archive

 
Seasons in Scottish football